Kelly Arnold is an American politician serving as the Sedgwick County Clerk. He is in his third term, having first been elected in 2008. From January 2013 to February 2019, Kelly served as the chairman of the Kansas Republican Party.

Early life and education
Kelly Arnold was born and raised in McPherson, Kansas. After he graduated from McPherson High School, he earned bachelor degrees in Business Management and Finance from Tabor College in Hillsboro. He later graduated from Wichita State University's Hugo Wall School of Public Affairs as Certified Master County Clerk.

Career

Arnold worked in the finance industry before his 2008 election to the office of Sedgwick County Clerk. He ran unopposed in 2012 and 2016. He is responsible for private and commercial filings. He is a member of the Executive Committee for South Central Kansas of the County Clerks & Election Officials.

As Sedgwick County Clerk, Kelly provides quality, efficient service to Kansans and supports election officials across the state. The office of the Clerk is entrusted with a budget of over $1 million in taxpayer dollars and annually processes over 74,000 real-estate transactions. In his first two terms, Kelly returned over $400,000 taxpayer dollars while maintaining the quality, professional service Sedgwick County taxpayers expect and deserve. The County Clerk is tasked with securing the public's access to proceedings, transactions and reports of the county's governing board, as well as real property ownership transfers within Sedgwick County. Under Kelly’s leadership, the office has digitized nearly one million individual property records. These records have been organized, cataloged and placed into a searchable electronic database which is accessed by the public daily for property ownership research.

Arnold is chairman of the board of trustees of the Kansas Public Employee Retirement System and the Board of Directors at Hillsboro State Bank.

Political career
From January 2013 to February 2019, Arnold served as Chairman of the Kansas Republican Party (KSGOP). In February 2017, Arnold won a third term to chair the KSGOP. Previously, Arnold had been state vice chairman and Finance Director of the KSGOP. Prior to that he had chaired the Sedgwick County Republican Party between 2006 and 2010.

Arnold served for over ten years in the Young Republican National Federation, two years of which as treasurer of the Federation and is also a co-founder of the Republican Men's Leadership Series.

In 2016, Arnold was part of the Convention Rules Committee and the Committee on Arrangements for the 2016 Republican National Convention. Later in the year, he was also one of the state's presidential electors receiving over 20,000 emails from anti-Trump activists.

In June 2017, Arnold weighed a run for the office of Secretary of State of Kansas. In early 2018, opted to focus on his role as party chairman and did not launch a primary campaign.

Personal life
Arnold lives in Wichita, Kansas.

References

1978 births
Kansas Republicans
Living people
National Republican Convention politicians
People from McPherson, Kansas
People from Wichita, Kansas
Wichita State University alumni